Beach Point is the northeast tip of Thule Island, in the South Sandwich Islands, made conspicuous by a bare rock ridge and a narrow beach of boulders and pebbles. It was charted and named in 1930 by DI personnel on the Discovery II who made a landing there.

References
 

Headlands of South Georgia and the South Sandwich Islands